The 2021 Vietnamese Football League Second Division (known as the Asanzo Cup for sponsorship reasons) was the 21st season of the Vietnamese League Two. The season began on 4 May 2021.

On August 21, 2021, VFF had an online meeting with representatives of clubs to determine the 'fate' of professional tournaments in 2021 and finally came to the result of canceling all tournaments in the years, including the Second Division.

Competition format
14 teams will compete in the 2021 season, split into two equal groups of 7 each. The top two teams from each group will qualify for the final stage. The two teams wins the 2 final stage matches will gain promotion to 2022 V.League 2. The team with the fewest points among the 2 groups in the group stage will be relegated to 2022 Vietnamese League Three.

Teams

Stadium and locations

Note: Table lists in alphabetical order.

Number of teams by region

Personnel and kits

Group stage

Group A

Table

Results

Group B

Table

Results

Ranking of last-placed teams 
<onlyinclude>

<onlyinclude>

References

2021 in Vietnamese football